

Origins

The term “winders” was originally coined in 2008 by the sociologist John W. Leigh, in his article Moving towards new forms of social success, describing the new forms of social success in the United States, and in Western societies. The term (a contraction of the expression “windy winners”) goes back to the original way of experiencing social success by individuals uninhibited with regards to their own success, not looking as much to reconcile rival existential expectations (such as the bobos, for example) but rather to juxtapose them in a way which is not seeking to constitute a system.

Description
The analysis of this new group is positioned along the same lines as the social success models embodied respectively by yuppies, “hardcore winners” (traders and other “golden boys” of the 1980s), and then bobos. It borrows from the critical sociology of Michael Hartmann, as well as employment sociologists Peter Meiksins and Peter Whalley, whose work Putting work in its place: a quiet revolution
details the paradigm shift borne by the winders within the American employment market. As J. W. Leigh puts it: “In cultural terms, for example, he is a "multi-consumer": capable of frequenting art galleries or the screens of a public cinema, and listening to Haydn and Bach as much as Beyonce or Michael Jackson.” To this regard, the winder is considered a “cultural omnivore”

From this point of view, the “winder” is one of the many avatars of the ability of superior social classes to legitimise their own situation via positive and always renewing value systems.

See also
 Bobo
 Yuppie
 Critical theory
 Michael Parenti
 Memetics
 Socionics

References

External links
"Moving Towards New Forms of Social Success”, John W. Leigh, 2008, Southern Illinois University
"Cultural consumption in the fine and popular arts realms", Omar Lizardo and Sarah Skiles, 2008,  Sociology Compass 2: 485–502.
“Gone with the Winder”, a TNS marketing study, 2009

Social class subcultures
2008 neologisms
Social classes